Zarinsk is a town in Altai Krai, Russia, located on the Chumysh River  east of Barnaul. Population:

History
The railway station of Zarinskaya was established in 1952. It was granted urban-type settlement status in 1958 and town status in 1979.

Administrative and municipal status
Within the framework of administrative divisions, Zarinsk serves as the administrative center of Zarinsky District, even though it is not a part of it. As an administrative division, it is incorporated separately as the town of krai significance of Zarinsk—an administrative unit with the status equal to that of the districts. As a municipal division, the town of krai significance of Zarinsk is incorporated as Zarinsk Urban Okrug.

References

Notes

Sources

External links
Pictures of Zarinsk

Cities and towns in Altai Krai
Tomsk Governorate
Cities and towns built in the Soviet Union
Populated places established in the 1950s